Kongu may refer to:

 Kongu Nadu, a region of the Indian state of Tamil Nadu and its inhabitants
 Kongu Tamil, a dialect of Tamil language spoken in Western Tamil Nadu
Kongu vellala Gounder, a Dominant Landowning community in Western Tamil Nadu
 Kongu Express, a train connecting Coimbatore and New Delhi
Kongu Engineering College, college in Tamil Nadu, India
Kongunadu Makkal Desia Katchi, political party based on Tamil Nadu, India
Kongunadu Munnetra Kazhagam, political party based on Tamil Nadu, India
Tamil Nadu Kongu Ilaingar Peravai, political party based on Tamil Nadu, India
Kongu Chera dynasty

See also 
 Konga (disambiguation)
 Toa Kongu, a fictional character in the Bionicle universe

Language and nationality disambiguation pages